

This is a list of the National Register of Historic Places listings in Washington County, Arkansas.

This is intended to be a complete list of the properties and districts on the National Register of Historic Places in Washington County, Arkansas, United States.

There are 152 properties and districts listed on the National Register in the county.  Another 8 properties were once listed but have been removed.

Current listings

|}

Former listings

|}

See also

List of National Historic Landmarks in Arkansas
National Register of Historic Places listings in Arkansas

References

 
Washington County